Abacetus shilouvanus is a species of ground beetle in the subfamily Pterostichinae. It was described by Peringuey in 1904.

References

shilouvanus
Beetles described in 1904